The Second Urkullu Government was the regional government of the Basque Country led by President (Lehendakari) Iñigo Urkullu between 2016 and 2020. It was formed in November 2016 after the regional election.

Government

References

2016 establishments in the Basque Country (autonomous community)
Cabinets established in 2016
Cabinets of the Basque Country (autonomous community)